The Matchless Silver Arrow was a motorcycle made by Matchless from late 1929 to 1933. It had a cast iron head monoblock side-valve, 400 cc, transverse 18° V-twin with chain drive, designed by racer Charlie Collier.

Description
The narrow angle of the cylinder bank's V allowed the use of a one piece head, a practice used by Lancia in its early V4 automobile engines. The rear suspension was a cantilever design using two springs and friction dampers beneath the saddle, very similar to the 1928 Vincent HRD design. Linked brakes were used, as had appeared on the 1925 Rudge Four.  The carburettor was an Amal type 4/014 (bottom petrol feed).

The bike did not sell well and within the year led to the Bert Collier designed Matchless Silver Hawk.

Models
Two models were produced, the 'Standard model' which had acetylene lighting and bulb horn, priced in 1930 at £57/10/6 and the 'De Luxe model' which had electric lighting and instrument panel, priced in 1930 at £63/2/6. In 1931 both were designated A/2 and minor changes included a four speed gearbox with improved gear ratios with lower 1st and higher top gear and a more rounded petrol tank,  the Amal carburettor jet was changed from 70 to 55 and the diameter of the exhaust pipe was increased with ports on the head spaced further apart (65/8" instead of 51/8").

References

External links
 Picture of Silver Arrow

Silver Arrow